Choi Yu-hwa (born October 10, 1985) is a South Korean actress. Choi entered the entertainment industry after winning the Fashion Model Award at the fashion magazine CeCi's Model Contest in 2005. She debuted in the one-act Drama Special "The Great Gye Choon-bin" (2010), and in the television series My Princess (2011), she gained attention for her looks and acting ability.

Filmography

Film

Television series

Web series

References

External links 
 
 
 

1985 births
Living people
21st-century South Korean actresses
South Korean television actresses
South Korean film actresses